Fort White may refer to:

Fort White, Burma, a small military station built by the British Army
Fort White, Eastern Cape, established in 1835 as a base for the British army
Fort White, Florida